Saros cycle series 119 for solar eclipses occurs at the Moon's ascending node, repeating every 18 years, 11 days, containing 71 events. All eclipses in this series occurs at the Moon's ascending node.

It is a part of Saros cycle 119, repeating every 18 years, 11 days, containing 71 events. The series started with partial solar eclipse on May 15, 850 AD. It contains total eclipses on August 9, 994 AD and August 20, 1012 with a hybrid eclipse on August 31, 1030. It has annular eclipses from September 10, 1048 through March 18, 1950. The series ends at member 71 as a partial eclipse on June 24, 2112. The longest duration of totality was only 32 seconds on August 20, 1012. The longest duration of annularity was 7 minutes, 37 seconds on September 1, 1625. The longest duration of hybridity was only 18 seconds on August 31, 1030.

Umbral eclipses
Umbral eclipses (annular, total and hybrid) can be further classified as either: 1) Central (two limits), 2) Central (one limit) or 3) Non-Central (one limit). The statistical distribution of these classes in Saros series 119 appears in the following table.

Events

References 
 http://eclipse.gsfc.nasa.gov/SEsaros/SEsaros119.html

External links
Saros cycle 119 - Information and visualization

Solar saros series